The Use and Abuse of History, Or, How the Past is Taught is a 1981 book by Marc Ferro about the interaction between politics and historiography. It has been described as classic within two decades of its publication.

References 

1981 non-fiction books
Books about historiography